The All Progressives Grand Alliance (APGA) is a political party in Nigeria.

Electoral history 
At the legislative elections held on 12 April 2003, the party won 1.4% of popular votes and 2 of 360 seats in the House of Representatives of Nigeria but no seats in the Senate. Its candidate at the presidential elections of 19 April 2003, Chukwuemeka Odumegwu Ojukwu, won 3.3% of the vote.

In gubernatorial elections of April 2011, Chief Rochas Okorocha (APGA) was elected governor of Imo state, polling 15% more votes than incumbent governor Ikedi Ohakim (PDP). An APGA candidate was first elected as governor of Anambra state.

In February 2013, a faction of the party merged with the Action Congress of Nigeria, the All Nigeria Peoples Party, and the Congress for Progressive Change to form the All Progressives Congress (APC). The party currently has a governor, who currently governs Anambra State, South Eastern, Nigeria. Also, in January 2018, the party clinched a seat in the Senate after a by-election. All Local Government Area Chairmen in Anambra State, are Card-carrying members of APGA.

The party experienced remarkable growth during the 2019 elections as it won 7 seats in the House of representatives compared to the 2015 elections where only two seats were won.

After a long internal leadership battle between Edozie Njoku and Victor Oye, who both claimed to be party chairman, the National Executive Committee suspended both from the party and appointed the Deputy National Chairman South Jude Okeke as Acting Chairman in June 2021. However, Oye continued to control much of the party and claim that he is the rightful chairman until the Supreme Court ruled in Oye's favour in October 2021.

Legislators

References

2003 establishments in Nigeria
Federalist parties in Nigeria
Nationalist parties in Africa
Pan-Africanism in Nigeria
Pan-Africanist political parties in Africa
Political parties established in 2003
Political parties in Nigeria
Progressive parties